In Greek mythology, Thoön (Ancient Greek: Θόων Thóōn) is a name that refers to:
 Thoon, one of the Gigantes (also called Thoas), who, together with Agrios, was clubbed to death by the Moirai during the Gigantomachy.
 Thoon, one of the Trojans, son of Phaenops and twin brother of Xanthus. He and his brother were killed by Diomedes.
 Thoon, another Trojan, who was killed by Antilochus during the attack on the Achaean wall.
 Thoon, a Lycian ally of the Trojans who followed their leader, Sarpedon, to fight in the Trojan War. He was slain by the Greek hero Odysseus during the siege of Troy.
 Thoon, one of the Phaeacians, a participant in the games in honor of Odysseus.
 Thoon, one of the warriors in Dionysus' army during his Indian campaign. He died at the hands of Corymbasus (Κορύμβασος).
 Thoon, son of Icarius of Sparta and Asterodia, daughter of Eurypylus. He was the brother of Amasichus, Phalereus, Pheremmelias, Perilaos and Laodice or Laodamia.

See also 
  for Jovian asteroid 34746 Thoon

Notes

References 
 Apollodorus, The Library with an English Translation by Sir James George Frazer, F.B.A., F.R.S. in 2 Volumes, Cambridge, MA, Harvard University Press; London, William Heinemann Ltd. 1921. . Online version at the Perseus Digital Library. Greek text available from the same website.
 Homer, The Iliad with an English Translation by A.T. Murray, Ph.D. in two volumes. Cambridge, MA., Harvard University Press; London, William Heinemann, Ltd. 1924. . Online version at the Perseus Digital Library.
Homer, Homeri Opera in five volumes. Oxford, Oxford University Press. 1920. . Greek text available at the Perseus Digital Library.
 Homer, The Odyssey with an English Translation by A.T. Murray, PH.D. in two volumes. Cambridge, MA., Harvard University Press; London, William Heinemann, Ltd. 1919. . Online version at the Perseus Digital Library. Greek text available from the same website.
 Nonnus of Panopolis, Dionysiaca translated by William Henry Denham Rouse (1863-1950), from the Loeb Classical Library, Cambridge, MA, Harvard University Press, 1940.  Online version at the Topos Text Project.
 Nonnus of Panopolis, Dionysiaca. 3 Vols. W.H.D. Rouse. Cambridge, MA., Harvard University Press; London, William Heinemann, Ltd. 1940-1942. Greek text available at the Perseus Digital Library.
 Publius Ovidius Naso, Metamorphoses translated by Brookes More (1859-1942). Boston, Cornhill Publishing Co. 1922. Online version at the Perseus Digital Library.
 Publius Ovidius Naso, Metamorphoses. Hugo Magnus. Gotha (Germany). Friedr. Andr. Perthes. 1892. Latin text available at the Perseus Digital Library.

Gigantes
Trojans
People of the Trojan War
Characters in the Odyssey
Laconian characters in Greek mythology
Dionysus in mythology